West Durham Wind Farm is a wind farm near Tow Law, County Durham, England.

History
Developed by County Durham-based company the Banks Group, the farm was planned as the largest wind farm in North East England. Construction of the farm began on the 11 July 2008. It was hoped that the commissioning of the turbines would make County Durham the first English county to hit its 2010 renewable energies target. The farm was commissioned in May 2009. In 2009 it was purchased by the Electricity Supply Board

Design and specification
The wind farm has a nameplate capacity of 24MW, containing twelve Repower MM82 turbines each rated at 2MW. It was the first wind farm containing turbines supported on driven steel tubular piles.

References

Wind farms in England
Power stations in North East England